William Henry Jeavons (9 February 1912 – 1992) was an English professional footballer who played as a winger.

References

1912 births
1992 deaths
Footballers from Sheffield
English footballers
Association football midfielders
Chesterfield F.C. players
Burnley F.C. players
Accrington Stanley F.C. (1891) players
Oldham Athletic A.F.C. players
Southport F.C. players
Wrexham A.F.C. players
English Football League players